Here We Come is  an album by jazz group The Three Sounds, featuring performances recorded in 1960 and released on the Blue Note label.

Reception

The Allmusic review by Stephen Thomas Erlewine awarded the album 3 stars, stating "Here We Come is a typically classy and entertaining collection from the Three Sounds... overall the album has a warm, relaxed vibe that makes the romanticism particularly welcoming."

Track listing
 "Now's the Time" (Parker) - 5:43
 "Summertime" (George Gershwin, Ira Gershwin, DuBose Heyward) -  5:34
 "Here We Come" (Gene Harris) - 4:36
 "Just Squeeze Me" (Duke Ellington, Lee Gaines) - 4:20
 "Broadway" (Billy Bird, Teddy McRae, Henri Woode) - 3:55
 "Our Love Is Here to Stay" (Gershwin) - 4:23
 "Poinciana" (Bernier, Nat Simon) - 5:28
 "Sonnymoon for Two" (Rollins) - 4:43

Recorded on December 13 (tracks 2, 3, 7 & 8) and December 14 (tracks 1 & 4-6), 1960

Personnel
Gene Harris - piano
Andrew Simpkins - bass
Bill Dowdy - drums

References

Blue Note Records albums
The Three Sounds albums
1962 albums
Albums produced by Alfred Lion
Albums recorded at Van Gelder Studio